FC Pozis Zelenodolsk was a Russian football team from Zelenodolsk. It played professionally in 1960, 1963–1969 and 1993–1998. They played on the second-highest level in the Soviet First League in 1960, taking 13th place in Zone 4.

Team name history
 1960–1965: FC Progress Zelenodolsk
 1966–1992: FC Chaika Zelenodolsk
 1993–2003: FC Progress Zelenodolsk
 2004–2006: FC Pozis Zelenodolsk

External links
  Team history at KLISF

Association football clubs established in 1960
Association football clubs disestablished in 2007
Defunct football clubs in Russia
Sport in Tatarstan
1960 establishments in Russia
2007 disestablishments in Russia